Ritambhara is the fashion carnival of Antaragni, the annual cultural fest of the Indian Institute of Technology Kanpur held in the month of October. It is a three-day-long event, attracting participation from more than 100 colleges across the country. Ritambhara has witnessed judges like Nawazuddin Siddiqui, Kunal Kapoor, Kanika Kapur, Arnela Zekovic, Simran Kaur Mundi, Bidita Bag, Noyonita Lodh, Shilpa Singh. Started in 1964, by a group of enthusiastic IITians, Ritambhara, now in its 53rd edition serves as a platform for designers and models alike to showcase their talents and skills through several themed competitive events. It is a non-profit event run solely by the students of IIT Kanpur.  It was initially small and was funded entirely by the Student Gymkhana of IIT Kanpur.But with time it acquired fame in the world of fashion and today the budget is raised through sponsorship. Over the years, Ritambhara has also attracted considerable media attention and numerous well-known sponsors.

Competitions 

Ritambhara as a whole comprises several competitions:

Ritambhara Prelims - This is held on the first day of Antaragni, witnessing participation from about 20 college teams, which compete to be selected further by the jury for the Finale round.

Ritambhara Finale - On the next day of Prelims, the selected teams compete further, of which one team with a great éclat is declared as the winner and one to be the runner-up. The best performing models are given the titles of Mr. Ritambhara and Ms. Ritambhara.

Diseñador - On the third day, we give designers an opportunity to completely design an entire wardrobe along with the accessories to accentuate the model and bring out the character of your dreams.

 Mr. and Ms. Impressionante - On the third day, this event sees individual participants, instead of teams, competing for the title of Mr. Impressionante and Ms. Impressionante.

 Elegancia - It is an online selfie contest which invites participation from all over the country and the winner is decided based on the number of votes on his/her selfie.

Dream On campaign 
The Dream On campaign allows participants to be mentored by people working in industry. Dream On was held for the first time with Antaragni 12. This concept was also introduced in Ritambhara at the same time. In the past, the winners were provided with direct professional portfolio shoots with fashion photographers, fashion designers and modelling agencies including Rohit Dhingra, Faces Model Management, Modelling India, Josh Ghoraya, Surendri.

Participating colleges 
Ritambhara includes participation from several fashion and non-fashion colleges of the country like NIFT Delhi, NIFT Kolkata, INIFD Ludhiana, St. Xaviers Kolkata, Pearl Delhi and many more. University of Delhi (DU) along with colleges from states like U.P., Punjab, Rajasthan and Haryana, and colleges from the Kolkata circuit. There is altogether participation from more than 50 colleges nationwide.

Judges 
Ritambhara has seen fashion designers, fashion photographers, models, Bollywood actors and actresses as its judges in the past few years.

Awards and prizes 
• Ritambhara

For Models(1 male and 1 female):

1. Entry into the final round of Impressionante.

2. Title of Mr. and Miss Ritambhara.

3. Modelling Assignments or portfolio under renowned people of the industry.

For Teams:

1. 1st Team ₹ 35,000 (COULD BE CHANGED)

2. 2nd Team ₹ 20,000 (COULD BE CHANGED)

A lot of goodies are at stake too. Some special prizes to be unveiled shortly. Stay connected through our Ritambhara website and facebook page.

For Designer (one):

1. Title of best designer.

2. Cash prize INR 10k

3. Internship under a renowned fashion designer.

•Diseñador

1. 1st Prize- INR12000 2nd Prize- INR8000.

2. Designers of the winning team would be awarded design internship at a prestigious fashion firm.

3. The models will receive UCB and VLCC vouchers.

4. The Best three designs along with the photoshoot, will be featured on a renowned media platform.

• Impressionante

1. 1st Prize INR 8000 each

2. Mr. and Miss Impressionante will be awarded with a cash prize of ₹ 8000/each (COULD BE CHANGED) and a portfolio to be shot by a renowned photographer.

3.Winners will get a mention in popular fashion magazine''.

• Elegancia

1. Weekly winners will be announced and will get a chance to win exciting goodies.

2. One male and one female winner will be declared at the end of the contest.

Commercial opportunities 
Ritambhara has attracted sponsorships from brands due to participation of students from all over India. Alumni also visit the institute during this time. Companies associated with Ritambhara in 2014 include Monte Carlo and Vimal as Title Sponsors; Pantaloons, Turtle and Woodland as Associate Title Sponsors. Ritambhara has been associated with fashion magazines like FHM (India), Maxim (India), Abraxas Lifestyle and youth magazine like Abraxas NU as media partners.

Gallery

References

External links 

 

Fashion events in India